Tie goes to the runner is a popular interpretation of baseball rules.  The claim is that a forced runner, usually the batter-runner, who arrives on base the same time as the ball is safe.  However, umpires generally reject the concept that baseball provides for a tie in this way, and instead rule on the basis that either the player or the ball has reached the base first.

The wording of rule 5.09(a)(10), formerly 6.05(j), of the Official Baseball Rules is that a batter is out when "After a third strike or after he hits a fair ball, he or first base is tagged before he touches first base".  Therefore, if the runner or first base is not tagged before he touches first base, he is safe. 

In response to a question from a Little League umpire, Major League Baseball umpire Tim McClelland has written that the concept of a tie at a base does not exist, and that a runner either beats the ball or does not. In 2009, umpire Mark Dewdeny, a contributor for Bleacher Report, citing McClelland, also rejected the idea of a tie, and further commented that even if a "physicist couldn't make an argument one way or the other" from watching an instant replay, the runner would still be out.

References

Baseball plays
Baseball rules
Baseball terminology